= Rathbraughan =

Rathbraughan Rath Bracháin
- Townland
- Location in Ireland
- Coordinates: 54°17′09″N 8°27′57″W
- Country: Ireland
- Province: Connacht
- County: County Sligo
- Time zone: UTC+0 (GMT)
  - Summer (DST): UTC+1 (IST)

Rathbraughan (Irish: Rath Bracháin) is a townland in County Sligo, Ireland just north of Sligo Town. It gives its name to Rathbraughan Line, the main road through the area, and to Rathbraughan Park, a housing estate on the northern edge of Sligo Town which was built in the 1980s.

== See also ==
- List of towns in the Republic of Ireland
